Events from the year 1997 in Jordan.

Incumbents
Monarch: Hussein 
Prime Minister: Abdul Karim al-Kabariti (until 9 March), Abdelsalam al-Majali (starting 9 March)

Events

1997 Jordanian general election
Khaled Mashal assassination attempt

See also

 Years in Iraq
 Years in Syria
 Years in Saudi Arabia

References

 
1990s in Jordan
Jordan
Jordan
Years of the 20th century in Jordan